Boyd Matson (born April 26, 1947) is the former anchor of National Geographic Explorer and a former co-anchor of NBC's Sunday Today program. He was also an NBC News correspondent in the 1980s, working mostly on news features and earlier as a sports reporter on KNBC in Los Angeles. He now hosts the show Wild Chronicles on PBS and the nationwide radio program NG Weekend. He also writes a monthly column for NG Traveler magazine. He lives in Virginia with his wife, Betty Hudson, and their two children.

References

NBC News people
CNBC people
Living people
1947 births
Place of birth missing (living people)